State Highway 17, abbreviated as SH-17, is an east–west highway in Oklahoma. It is a relatively short highway, extending for only  from U.S. Highway 277 (US-277) in Elgin to Business US-81 in Rush Springs. It has no lettered spur routes (it does not connect to SH-17A in Wynnewood).

SH-17 was first established as a state highway, connecting Sterling to Rush Springs, in the mid-1930s. It was later extended west over a portion of SH-65, bringing its western terminus to Elgin.

Route description
SH-17 begins at U.S. Highway 277 in the north-central part of Elgin. SH-17 proceeds due east out of town for approximately  before turning southeast. On the west side of town, SH-17 serves as the northern terminus of SH-65, which follows 5th Avenue southward out of town. SH-17 continues east through Sterling along Main Street.

East of Sterling, SH-17 crosses Beaver Creek near its source. The route then turns northeast, turning back east to follow the same line of latitude it originally followed in Elgin. The highway passes south of the ghost town of Acme. On the west side of Rush Springs, it intersects the US-81 expressway bypass of the town. SH-17 then continues east along Blakeley Avenue into downtown Rush Springs, where it ends at US-81's Rush Springs business loop.

History
The present-day State Highway 17 was commissioned between May 1936 and April 1937. Originally, the all-dirt highway began in Sterling and ran to Rush Springs; the Sterling–Elgin portion of the highway was at that time part of SH-65. However, at some point between April 1937 and April 1938, SH-65 was truncated to the south, and SH-17 was extended west to Elgin along the former route of SH-65. No further changes have been made to SH-17's route since.

Junction list

References

External links

SH-17 at OKHighways

017
Transportation in Comanche County, Oklahoma
Transportation in Grady County, Oklahoma